The 2013 Charleston Battery season will be the club's 21st season of existence. It is the Battery's fourth consecutive year in the third tier of American soccer, playing in the USL Professional Division for their third season. Charleston is entering the season as the defending USL Pro champions.

Background

Club

Roster

Team management

Competitions

Exhibition

Carolina Challenge Cup

Preseason

USL Pro

U.S. Open Cup

Statistics

Transfers

References 

Charleston Battery
Charleston Battery seasons
American soccer clubs 2013 season
2013 in sports in South Carolina